William Bon Mardion (born 4 October 1983) is a French ski mountaineer.

Bon Mardion was born and lives in Arêches where he is member of the Club Multisports Arêches-Beaufort. He started ski mountaineering in 1998. He competed first as a member of the "Espoirs" team at the Pierra Menta race in the same year and has been member of the national team since 2006.

Selected results 
 2005:
 10th, European Championship single race
 2007: 
 2nd, European Championship team race (together with Alexandre Pellicier)
 2nd, European Championship combination ranking
 3rd, European Championship single race
 2008: 
 4th, World Championship team race (together with Grégory Gachet)
 2010:
 3rd, World Championship relay race (together with Didier Blanc, Florent Perrier and Grégory Gachet)
 4th, World Championship team race (together with Alexandre Pellicier)
 8th, World Championship single race
 9th, World Championship combination ranking
 2011:
 2nd, World Championship single race
 2nd, World Championship vertical, combined ranking
 3rd, World Championship vertical race
 3rd, World Championship team race (together with Didier Blanc)
 3rd, World Championship relay, together with Didier Blanc, Xavier Gachet and Yannick Buffet
 2012:
 1st, European Championship single
 2nd, European Championship relay, together with Alexis Sévennec-Verdier, Valentin Favre and Yannick Buffet
 5th, World Championship vertical, combined ranking
 6th, European Championship vertical race
 7th, European Championship sprint

Pierra Menta 

 2007: 4th, together with Vincent Meilleur
 2008: 4th, together with Grégory Gachet
 2009: 7th, together with Nicolas Bonnet
 2010: 2nd, together with Florent Perrier
 2011: 4th, together with Martin Anthamatten
 2012: 3rd, together with Pietro Lanfranchi
 2013: 1st, together with Mathéo Jacquemoud

Trofeo Mezzalama 

 2011: 1st, together with Kílian Jornet Burgada and Didier Blanc

External links 
 Official website 
 William Bon Mardion at skimountaineering.org

References 

1983 births
Living people
French male ski mountaineers
Sportspeople from Savoie